Peaked at 8 in Top Reggae Albums, 9 in Top Tropical Albums and 59 in Top Latin Albums.

Track listing
 El Escalzeo
 Si Tú No Me Llamas
 Mi Locura (feat. Noriega)
 Banshee Robao (feat. Yerai & Warionex)
 Eres Prohibida (feat. Nicky Jam)
 Somos Calle (feat. Don Chezina)
 Carita de Nena
 Put Your Handz Up! (feat. Yomo)
 To'a la Noche (feat. Jenay)
 Aguajera
 Asegúrate (feat. Baby Rasta)
 Mujeres
 Ya Me Cansé (feat. Denual)
 Rompe y Vacila
 Rompe el Suelo (feat. Bimbo, Yomo)
 Mi Locura [Street Mix] (feat. Noriega)
 Vamo' Allá - (feat. Gavilan, Don Chezina, Cosculluela, Yomo) (diss to Héctor el Father)
 Is This Love (Es Amor) (Bob Marley cover)

References

2004 albums
Master Joe & O.G. Black albums
Albums produced by Rafy Mercenario